Virginia Louise Giuffre (née Roberts; born August 9, 1983) is an American-Australian campaigner who offers support to victims of sex trafficking. She is an alleged victim of the sex trafficking ring of Jeffrey Epstein. Giuffre created Victims Refuse Silence, a non-profit based in the United States, in 2015, which was relaunched under the name Speak Out, Act, Reclaim (SOAR) in November 2021. She has given a detailed account to many American and British reporters about her experiences of being trafficked by Epstein and Ghislaine Maxwell.

Giuffre has pursued criminal and civil actions against Epstein and Maxwell, and has appealed directly to the public for justice and awareness. She sued Maxwell for defamation in 2015, and the case was settled in Giuffre's favor for an undisclosed sum in 2017. On July 2, 2019, the United States Court of Appeals for the Second Circuit ordered the unsealing of documents from the earlier civil suit by Giuffre against Maxwell. The first batch of documents from Giuffre's suit were released to the public on August 9, 2019, further implicating Epstein, Maxwell, and a number of their associates. The following day, August 10, 2019, Epstein was found dead in his Manhattan prison cell.

In an October 2019 interview for BBC's Panorama, aired on December 2, Giuffre described her alleged experiences of being sex trafficked by Epstein for Britain's Prince Andrew, which helped shift public opinion against the prince.

Early life
Virginia Giuffre was born Virginia Louise Roberts in Sacramento, California, on August 9, 1983, to parents Sky and Lynn Roberts. The family relocated to Loxahatchee in Palm Beach County, Florida, when she was four years old. Giuffre has a younger brother. It was reported that she had come from a "troubled home" and, from the age of seven, was molested by a close family friend. "I was just so mentally scarred already at such a young age, and I ran away from that," she said on Panorama in 2019. Giuffre told the Miami Herald that she went from being in "an abusive situation, to being a runaway, to living in foster homes". She lived on the streets at age 14, where she says she found only, "hunger and pain and [more] abuse". Later she was abused by a 65-year-old sex trafficker, Ron Eppinger, in Miami. Giuffre lived with Eppinger for approximately 6 months. Eppinger reportedly ran a front business for international sex trafficking known as the modeling agency "Perfect 10". He was raided by the FBI and later pleaded guilty to charges of alien smuggling for prostitution, interstate travel for prostitution, and money laundering.

At the age of 14, Giuffre reunited with her father and returned to live with him. Her father worked as a maintenance manager at the Mar-a-Lago property owned by Donald Trump, and also helped Giuffre obtain a job there.

Association with Epstein (2000–2002) 
In mid-2000, Giuffre met Ghislaine Maxwell when working as a spa attendant at Donald Trump's private Mar-a-Lago club while reading a book about massage therapy. Maxwell, a British socialite and daughter of the late media tycoon Robert Maxwell, approached Giuffre, noted the book that she was reading, inquired about her interest in massage, and offered her a potential job working for Epstein as a traveling masseuse with the assurance that no experience was necessary. When Giuffre arrived at Epstein's Palm Beach home, she says he was naked lying down and Maxwell told her how to massage him.  "They seemed like nice people so I trusted them, and I told them I'd had a really hard time in my life up until then - I'd been a runaway, I'd been sexually abused, physically abused… That was the worst thing I could have told them because now they knew how vulnerable I was," Giuffre stated.  Giuffre has stated that after Maxwell introduced her to Jeffrey Epstein, the two quickly began grooming her to provide sexual services under the guise that she was to be trained as a professional massage therapist.

Between 2000 and 2002, Giuffre was closely associated with Epstein and Maxwell, traveling between Epstein's residences in Palm Beach and Manhattan (at the Herbert N. Straus House), with additional trips to Epstein's Zorro ranch in New Mexico and private island Little Saint James. In the Miami Heralds investigative journalism series "Perversion of Justice", Giuffre describes her experiences of being trafficked by Epstein to provide massages and sexual services for him and a number of his business associates over a two-and-a-half-year period. In her interview with the BBC, Giuffre said she was "passed around like a platter of fruit" to Epstein's powerful associates, and taken round the world on private jets.

Of the instance in March 2001 that Giuffre was allegedly trafficked to Prince Andrew, she stated in an interview that it was a "wicked" and "really scary time" in her life and that she "couldn't comprehend how in the highest level of the government powerful people were allowing this to happen. Not just allowing but participating in it". After visiting a nightclub, Giuffre says Maxwell told her that she, "had to do for Andrew what I do for Jeffrey". In court documents from a civil suit that were released from seal in 2019, Giuffre named several others that she claims Epstein and Maxwell instructed her to have sex with, including hedge fund manager Glenn Dubin, attorney Alan Dershowitz, politician Bill Richardson, the late MIT scientist Marvin Minsky, lawyer George J. Mitchell, and MC2 modeling agent Jean-Luc Brunel. In an unsealed deposition, Giuffre also recounted seeing President Bill Clinton with two young women while on Epstein's island. Many of the men denied Giuffre's allegations.

In September 2002, at the age of 19, Giuffre flew to Thailand and attended the International Training Massage School in Chiang Mai. Maxwell provided her with tickets to travel to Thailand, and instructed her to meet with a specific Thai girl to bring her back to the United States for Epstein. While at the massage school in Thailand in 2002, she met Robert Giuffre, an Australian martial arts trainer, and the two married quickly thereafter. She contacted Epstein and informed him that she would not be returning as planned. She and her husband started a life and family in Australia, and Giuffre broke off contact with Epstein and Maxwell. For five years, Giuffre and her husband lived a quiet life in Australia with their young children.

First contact by authorities 
In March 2005, while Giuffre was still establishing her family in Australia, the Palm Beach Police Department began investigating Epstein after a 14-year-old girl and her parents reported his behavior. The girl described being recruited by a female classmate from her high school to give Epstein a massage at his mansion in exchange for money, wherein he subsequently molested her. By October 2005, the police had a growing list of girls with similar claims of sexual abuse, statements from Epstein's butlers corroborating their claims, and a search warrant for his Palm Beach property.

Police detectives noted that the accusers all described a similar pattern where Epstein would ask them to massage him and then sexually assault them during the massage. When police searched through Epstein's trash, they found notes with the telephone numbers of the girls on them. One of the girls was called by Epstein's assistant while being questioned by police.

Giuffre relayed to the Miami Herald that she received a series of phone calls in rapid succession over three days in 2007. The first call was from Maxwell, then one day later came a call from Epstein, both of whom asked if she had spoken to authorities, followed by a third call from an FBI agent who stated that Giuffre had been identified as a victim during the first criminal case against Epstein.  She resisted speaking at length to the FBI until she was approached again about the matter in person, this time by the Australian Federal Police, six months after being contacted by phone.

Photos, records and witnesses confirm large parts of Giuffre's statements about her time with Epstein.

Legal proceedings

First criminal case 
In 2006, a year before Giuffre was first contacted by authorities, the Palm Beach Police Department had a growing body of evidence against Epstein, and signed a probable cause affidavit charging him with multiple counts of unlawful sex acts with a minor. Epstein hired a team of powerful lawyers, including Alan Dershowitz, Jack Goldberger, Kenneth Starr, and Jay Lefkowitz, to serve in his defense. As the case progressed, Police Chief Michael Reiter became alarmed at the handling of the case by state prosecutors and then state attorney, Barry Krischer. On May 1, 2006, Reiter asked Krischer to remove himself from the case; when Krischer declined, Police Chief Reiter turned his evidence over to the FBI for federal prosecution. While Reiter was initially hopeful that the FBI would thoroughly investigate and move the matter to a conclusion, in 2007, then South Florida U.S. Attorney Alexander Acosta decided not to prosecute Epstein in federal court and referred the matter back to the local jurisdiction.

Lead police detective Joseph Recarey asserted that the state prosecutors were at first eager to pursue criminal action against Epstein, but that "everything took a turn" when lawyer Alan Dershowitz got involved. Krischer then decided to take the unusual action of turning Epstein's case over to a grand jury, and then presented testimony from only one girl. Epstein's legal team aggressively sought concessions and prolonged the process when negotiating a plea deal with Alex Acosta. Acosta, who described the tactics of Epstein's lawyers as a "year-long assault on the prosecution and prosecutors", eventually agreed to sign a controversial non-prosecution agreement in 2008, which was done without informing the victims, later determined to be in violation of the Crime Victims' Rights Act.

Reiter expressed that the state and federal prosecutors' handling of the Epstein case amounted to "the worst failure of the criminal justice system" in modern times.

Crime Victims' Rights Act lawsuit (2008–2019) 
In 2008, a lawsuit (Jane Doe v. United States of America) was filed by Bradley Edwards and Paul G. Cassell that accused the U.S. Justice Department of violating the Crime Victims' Rights Act during the first criminal case against Epstein by failing to allow several of his victims to challenge his plea deal. Epstein sued Bradley Edwards for civil racketeering but later dropped his suit; Edwards countersued for malicious prosecution, with the result that Epstein issued a public apology to the lawyer and settled the case for an undisclosed sum in December 2018. Edwards, who represents several Epstein accusers in addition to Giuffre, reportedly settled in aid of his clients, whose greatest wish was to pursue their larger objective of having their allegations heard in a federal court in order to overturn the non-prosecution agreement. Edwards stated that "They're willing to talk. They want to share their stories. This was part of their healing."

In a February 2019 ruling, District Judge Kenneth Marra determined that prosecutors had violated victims' rights as defined by the Crime Victims' Rights Act.

Victims' civil suit 
In May 2009, Giuffre filed a lawsuit as Jane Doe 102 against Epstein and accused Maxwell of recruiting her to a life of being sexually trafficked while she was a minor.  By late 2009, dozens of Epstein's victims had filed civil lawsuits against him. All suits were settled for undisclosed amounts. In January 2022, unsealed documents revealed that the settlement amount of the 2009 case, entitled Jane Doe No. 102 vs. Jeffrey Epstein, was $500,000 and other unspecified "valuable consideration."

Decision to speak out publicly 

Giuffre credited the birth of her daughter on January 7, 2010, as the date she decided to come forward publicly and begin speaking out about her experiences of sexual abuse and trafficking, despite the risks. Vanity Fair stated that Giuffre's story was first publicized in March 2011 by the Mail on Sunday; the coverage included the photo showing Prince Andrew with his arm around her at Maxwell's house in Belgravia, London. FBI agents again made contact with Giuffre, this time at the US consulate in Sydney in 2011, soon after she went public with allegations against Epstein.

In December 2014, Giuffre set up the framework for her organization Victims Refuse Silence.  It was registered as a 501(c)(3) non-profit organization in 2015.  The objective of Victims Refuse Silence is to "help survivors surmount the shame, silence, and intimidation typically experienced by victims of sexual abuse, and to help others to escape becoming victims of sex trafficking". For her organization, Giuffre has used imagery of a blue Morpho butterfly to symbolize the transformation and empowerment that occurs when a victim becomes a survivor. Blue is the international color of human trafficking awareness. The United States has designated January as Human Trafficking Awareness Month with January 11 listed as National Wear Blue Day. Giuffre's charity was relaunched in November 2021 under the name Speak Out, Act, Reclaim (SOAR).

Prince Andrew allegations 
In a December 2014 Florida court filing, intended for inclusion in the 2008 Crime Victims' Rights Act lawsuit, Giuffre described being trafficked to Prince Andrew, Duke of York, at least three times when she was 17 in 2001 for rape. She claims that Epstein and Ghislaine Maxwell took her to Tramp nightclub in London, where she met and danced with Andrew and that later that night, while en route to Maxwell's Belgravia residence, Maxwell instructed Giuffre to "do for (Prince Andrew) what you do for Epstein". She alleged Epstein paid her $15,000 after she had sex with the Duke in London.

A photo that shows Giuffre, Prince Andrew and Maxwell in Ghislaine's apartment has been widely circulated since 2011. Prince Andrew's ten-year role as a United Kingdom trade envoy was terminated in July 2011, and he reportedly cut all ties with Epstein. When asked in 2011 whether Prince Andrew would have information, she told her lawyers: "Yes, he would know a lot of the truth." "Again, I don't know how much he would be able to help you with, but seeing he's in a lot of trouble himself these days, I think he might," she added. "So, I think he may be valuable. I'm not too sure of him."

The second sexual encounter allegedly happened in Epstein's New York mansion. In court documents, Giuffre claimed that the third encounter with Prince Andrew was an orgy on Little Saint James that involved her, several underage girls from Eastern Europe, the Prince, and Jeffrey Epstein himself.

In 2015, spokespersons for the British royal family stated that "any suggestion of impropriety with underage minors is categorically untrue", later repeating the denials. Requests from Giuffre's lawyers for a statement under oath from the Duke about the allegations were returned unanswered.

In August 2021, Giuffre started a New York lawsuit against Prince Andrew, accusing him of "sexual assault and intentional infliction of emotional distress". Giuffre’s lawsuit, which seeks unspecified damages, was brought before the New York federal judge Lewis A. Kaplan.

In January 2022 Giuffre's former boyfriend, Anthony Figueroa, said on Good Morning Britain that Giuffre told him Epstein would take her to meet Prince Andrew. Figueroa alleged the meeting had taken place in London, before which "she was really nervous and scared because she didn't know how to react to it." In a court filing, Prince Andrew's lawyers had previously referred to a statement by Figueroa's sister, Crystal Figueroa, who alleged that in her bid to find victims for Epstein, Giuffre had asked her "Do you know any girls who are kind of slutty?"

In the same month, Carolyn Andriano, who as a 14-year-old was introduced by Giuffre to Ghislaine Maxwell and Jeffrey Epstein and was a prosecution witness in the trial of Maxwell, claimed in an interview that then 17-year-old Giuffre told her in 2001 that she had slept with Prince Andrew. Andriano stated, "And she [Giuffre] said, 'I got to sleep with him'. She didn't seem upset about it. She thought it was pretty cool." Andriano testified that she was recruited by Giuffre at 14 and trained to give sexual massages: "At 14 years old, I was big breasted and I definitely could pass for 21 when I was made up. I did my own make-up but Virginia gave me clothes. She gave me these really tight skimpy shorts with a spaghetti strap top with all my cleavage hanging out. She just said whatever you do, don't say your age. And I didn't even ask why. I went along with it."

In February 2022, Prince Andrew agreed to an out-of-court settlement by paying an undisclosed sum of money.

In October 2022, Ghislaine Maxwell was interviewed by a documentary filmmaker while serving her sentence in prison, and stated that she now believed the photograph showing her together with Andrew and Virginia Giuffre was not "a true image", and added that in an email to her lawyer in 2015 she was trying to confirm that she recognised her own house, but the whole image cannot be authentic as "the original has never been produced". In another interview from prison, she said the photo was "a fake … there's never been an original and further there is no photograph. I've only ever seen a photocopy of it." Following the allegations, The Mail on Sunday, which first published the photograph in 2011, was contacted by photographer Michael Thomas who took 39 copies of the image, both front and back. The back of the photo has a time stamp showing it was developed on March 13, 2001 – three days after Andrew allegedly engaged in sexual activity with Giuffre – and it was printed at a one-hour photo lab at Walgreens in Florida, near Giuffre's former home.

Giuffre has claimed that on the first night she allegedly had sex with Andrew they got into the bath where "he started licking my toes, between my toes, the arches of my feet" before they went into the bedroom and had sex. She repeated these claims in a 2019 BBC interview. She described the bathroom in her unpublished memoir, stating "It was a beige marble tiled floor with a porcelain Victorian-style bathtub in the middle of the room." In January 2023, Ghislaine Maxwell's brother Ian Maxwell disputed the claims by releasing photos showing his acquaintances sitting in the bathtub where the incident allegedly took place. The photos were originally reserved as a defense for Ghislaine Maxwell's legal team if Giuffre was asked to testify. Ian Maxwell believed the photos "show conclusively that the bath is too small for any sort of sex frolicking. There is no 'Victorian bath', as Giuffre has claimed, which is proved both by the attached plan of the bathroom and the photos themselves."

Alan Dershowitz allegations and related lawsuits 
Giuffre claims that Epstein sex trafficked her to lawyer and Harvard law professor emeritus Alan Dershowitz at least six times, the first when she was aged 16. He denied the claims. Dershowitz represented Epstein in his 2008 criminal conviction and helped to negotiate the controversial non-prosecution agreement on his behalf.

The claims first appeared in a December 30, 2014, Florida court filing by lawyers Bradley J. Edwards and Paul G. Cassell which alleged that Dershowitz was one of several prominent figures, including Prince Andrew, to have participated in sexual activities with a minor later identified as Giuffre.  The affidavit from Giuffre was meant for inclusion as part of the 2008 lawsuit (Jane Doe v. USA) accusing the Justice Department of violating the Crime Victims Rights Act during Epstein's first criminal case.  Dershowitz vehemently denied the allegations in Giuffre's statement and sought disbarment of Edwards and Cassell, the lawyers filing the suit.  Edwards and Cassell sued Dershowitz for defamation in 2015; he countersued.  The two parties settled in 2016 for an undisclosed financial sum.

Following denials by Dershowitz, Giuffre stated, "I'm not going to be bullied back into silence."

In 2014, Giuffre was represented by Stanley Pottinger, whose firm specializes in sex abuse cases involving women and children. Anticipating the challenges that awaited Giuffre in accusing extremely wealthy and powerful individuals, Pottinger looked for another lawyer that could match this. At the request of Pottinger, David Boies and his firm Boies Schiller Flexner began representing Giuffre pro bono in 2014. Boies represents several of Epstein's accusers. In addition to Boies, attorneys for Giuffre include Brad Edwards and Paul Cassell.

In April 2019, Giuffre sued Dershowitz for defamation in New York, with Boies as her lawyer. That June, Dershowitz filed a motion to dismiss Giuffre's suit (which was later denied) and a motion to disqualify Boies' firm from representing her (which was later approved). Giuffre stated in September 2019 that she continued to stand by her claims of misconduct by Dershowitz. Dershowitz accused Boies of pressuring Giuffre to provide false testimony, in response to which Boies sued Dershowitz in November 2019 for defamation.

In April 2019, Maria Farmer filed an affidavit in support of Giuffre's defamation suit against Dershowitz which stated that while Farmer worked signing in guests at Epstein's front desk in 1995–1996, she had regularly encountered Dershowitz at the New York mansion at times when underage girls were present.

In October 2019, Charles Cooper took over representation of Giuffre in the defamation suit against Dershowitz after a judge ruled that Boies could not continue as Giuffre's lawyer because Dershowitz's claim that she conspired with her attorneys to make false claims had turned Boies into a potential witness.

A trial involving Dershowitz and Giuffre could have started in March 2023 after wrapping fact discovery by November 30, 2022 and expert discovery by February 15, 2023. However, on November 8, 2022, it was announced that Giuffre had dropped her allegations against Dershowitz, stating that she "may have made a mistake".

Civil cases

Virginia Roberts affidavit (2014) 
Giuffre filed court papers in Florida in January 2015, stating that Epstein trafficked her to Prince Andrew and Alan Dershowitz. In a sworn affidavit, she claims Maxwell worked as Epstein's madam. In April 2015, a federal judge ruled that Giuffre could not join the federal Crime Victims' Rights Act lawsuit, and her affidavit was stricken from the case.

Virginia Giuffre v. Ghislaine Maxwell (2015) 
As a result of Giuffre's allegations and Maxwell's comments about them, Giuffre sued Maxwell for defamation in federal court in New York in September 2015. After much legal confrontation, the case was settled under seal in June 2017 with Maxwell reportedly paying Giuffre "millions".

Virginia Giuffre v. Alan Dershowitz (2019)
In April 2019, Giuffre filed a federal civil defamation lawsuit against Alan Dershowitz in New York.

Giuffre was first represented by David Boies but Dershowitz had him removed from the case as he claimed that members of the law firm could be called to witness in the trial. She was subsequently represented by lawyer Charles Cooper. Boies filed a separate defamation lawsuit against Dershowitz for implying that Boies had pressured Giuffre into making false claims.

All claims were dismissed in November 2022, after attorneys for Giuffre, Boies, and Dershowitz filed joint stipulations, and no fees were awarded to either side. Giuffre stated she may have been mistaken in identifying Dershowitz.

Virginia Giuffre v. Prince Andrew (2021)

On August 9, 2021, Giuffre filed a civil lawsuit against Britain's Prince Andrew in New York alleging that she was forced to have several sexual encounters with the prince in the early 2000s after being trafficked by Epstein when she was 16 and 17 years old. Andrew has denied Giuffre's claims. On January 12, 2022, Judge Lewis A. Kaplan rejected Andrew's attempts to dismiss the case, allowing the sexual abuse lawsuit to proceed. On February 15, 2022, it was announced that both parties had reached an out-of-court settlement, which includes the Prince making a substantial donation to Giuffre's charity.

Rina Oh v. Virginia Giuffre (2021)
Rina Oh sued Giuffre for defamation in October 2021. Giuffre accused Oh of helping traffick girls for Epstein, while Oh maintains that she was a victim and that she has never helped traffickers. In 2022 in court documents Oh accused Giuffre of touching her sexually without consent while Epstein watched, but Giuffre denied the claim. She alleged Oh slashed her during sado masochistic games done for Epstein, but Oh denied this. Oh also alleges that Guiffre procured and abused minors.

Second criminal case
Jeffrey Epstein was arrested on July 6, 2019, at Teterboro Airport in New Jersey and charged with sex trafficking and sex trafficking conspiracy by prosecutors with the Public Corruption Unit of the Southern District of New York In the indictment, Epstein was accused of soliciting massages from underage girls where the activities became increasingly sexual and then of enlisting the girls to recruit other underage victims for pay. U.S. Attorney Geoffrey Berman of the U.S. District Court for the Southern District of New York appealed for other victims of Epstein to come forward. The federal indictment also listed the key role of Epstein's paid "employees and associates" responsible for scheduling victims.

One month after his arrest, Epstein was found dead on August 10, 2019, after reportedly hanging himself in his Manhattan prison cell.

On August 29, 2019, in the wake of Epstein's death 19 days prior, the case against Epstein was closed after District Judge Richard Berman dismissed all sex trafficking charges. Judge Berman expressed support for Epstein's accusers, stating that he invited them to speak publicly at a hearing on August 27, 2019, out of "respect" for "the difficult decisions victims made to come forward". Giuffre was among the 16 women who spoke publicly at the hearing, which included Anouska De Georgiou, Sarah Ransome, Jennifer Araoz, Chauntae Davies, Courtney Wild, Theresa J. Helm, and Marijke Chartouni. At the hearing, Giuffre stated, "The reckoning must not end. It must continue. He did not act alone. We the victims know that." Prosecutors signaled that they would continue an investigation for potential co-conspirators.

Media coverage and appearances 
Giuffre appeared on a special edition of Dateline NBC with Savannah Guthrie discussing the Epstein scandal along with victims Anouska De Georgiou, Rachel Benavidez, Jennifer Araoz, Marijke Chartouni and Chauntae Davies. The special, titled "Reckoning", aired on September 20, 2019.

Giuffre was interviewed for the 60 Minutes Australia investigation that aired on November 10, 2019. In the program she describes her experiences of being trafficked by Epstein and Maxwell to have sex with Prince Andrew three times in 2001: the first time being in London at Maxwell's Belgravia residence, the second at Epstein's New York mansion, and the final occurrence (involving multiple girls and the Prince) on Little Saint James.

Giuffre also gave an interview in October 2019 to the BBC, describing her experience of being sex-trafficked by Epstein to Prince Andrew, for a Panorama special, "The Prince and the Epstein Scandal", which aired on December 2, 2019. In the program, Giuffre directly appealed to the public by stating, "I implore the people in the UK to stand up beside me, to help me fight this fight, to not accept this as being ok."

BBC reporter Emily Maitlis conducted a Newsnight interview with Prince Andrew, discussing Giuffre's allegations and his friendship with Epstein, which aired on November 16, 2019. The reaction to the Prince's conduct during the interview was one of overwhelming disapproval; this, combined with Giuffre's public appeal, helped lead to a widespread shift in opinion by the British people. The prince resigned from his royal duties on November 20, 2019, as a number of organizations and charities that he was connected to severed ties. Despite the Prince's promises to assist authorities, in January 2020, U.S. attorney Geoffrey Berman stated that Prince Andrew had provided "zero cooperation" after the FBI and the Southern District of New York had requested to interview him as part of the Epstein inquiry.

Giuffre appeared, along with Maria Farmer, in a four-part Netflix series, released in May 2020, titled Jeffrey Epstein: Filthy Rich, directed by Lisa Bryant and based on the earlier book of the same name by James Patterson.

In July 2020, following Maxwell's federal indictment, Giuffre was interviewed by Gayle King for CBS This Morning.

Giuffre and other survivors of Epstein's sex trafficking ring were featured in the four-part documentary series Surviving Jeffrey Epstein which premiered on August 9, 2020, on Lifetime.

Personal life 
Following her marriage to Robert in 2002, Giuffre lived in the Glenning Valley suburb of Central Coast in New South Wales, Australia, for 11 years. The family relocated to the United States in November 2013 and stayed for several years, initially spending time in Florida, and later in Colorado in 2015. In 2019, it was reported that Giuffre lived in Cairns, Queensland, Australia, with her husband Robert and their three children: two sons and one daughter. In 2020, she moved with her family to Ocean Reef, a suburb of Perth, Western Australia.

See also 
 Justice for Victims of Trafficking Act

References

Further reading

External links 
 Unsealed Court Documents from Giuffre vs. Maxwell
 Unsealed Court Document containing a draft of Virginia Roberts memoir
 Unsealed Court Documents from Giuffre vs. Dershowitz

1983 births
Living people
Victims' rights organizations
American expatriates in Australia
Advocacy groups
People from Sacramento, California
People from Palm Beach County, Florida
Sexual abuse cover-ups
Jeffrey Epstein
Victims of underage prostitution
Activists from California
Anti–human trafficking activists
21st-century American women